Jack Brown (born 25 June 2000) is an English professional rugby league footballer who plays as a  or  for Hull F.C. in the Super League.

He has spent time on loan from Hull at Doncaster in Betfred League 1 and the Bradford Bulls in the Betfred Championship.

Background
Brown was born in Kingston upon Hull, East Riding of Yorkshire, England.

Playing career

Hull FC
In 2019 he made his Super League début for Hull F.C. against the Catalans Dragons, scoring a try as he helped his team onto a narrow 31-30 victory.

References

External links
Hull FC profile
SL profile

2000 births
Living people
Bradford Bulls players
Doncaster R.L.F.C. players
Hull F.C. players
Rugby league players from Kingston upon Hull
Rugby league props